The Mozart Fellowship is a composer residency attached to the Music Department of the University of Otago, one of the five Arts Fellowships at the university. It is the oldest full-time composition residency in New Zealand and is currently the only position of its kind; the list of past fellows includes many of New Zealand's most notable composers. The current Mozart Fellow is Kenneth Young (until January 2022).

History 
The Fellowship was established in 1969 and the first appointed Mozart Fellow was Anthony Watson. It is awarded for a 12-month period, and no composer may hold the Fellowship for more than two years. Composers are also expected to spend the majority of their time based in Dunedin.

The appointed composer is paid a stipend which allows him or her to live and are given the freedom to work on projects of their own choice, although traditionally many recipients of the award have written compositions for performers within the University's Music Department or the city's orchestra Dunedin Symphony.

A reunion of past and present fellowship holders was held at the university in 2007.

List of Mozart Fellows 

 1970–71 Anthony Watson
 1972 John Rimmer
 1973–74 Edwin Carr
 1975 Larry Pruden
 1976–77 Gillian Bibby
 1980 Chris Cree Brown
 1981 John Elmsly
 1983 Chris Cree Brown
 1984 Jonathan Besser
 1985 Kim Dyett
 1986–87 Nigel Keay
 1988–89 Anthony Ritchie
 1990–91 Martin Lodge
 1992 Gillian Whitehead and Bruce Crossman
 1993 Helen Bowater
 1994–95 Christopher Marshall
 1996 Cheryl Camm
 1997 Jason Kaminski
 1998 Paul Booth
 1999 Harold Anderson
 2000 Ross Carey
 2001 Alison Isadora
 2002 Michael Norris
 2003–04 Noel Sanders
 2005–06 Rachel Clement
 2007 Neville Copland
 2008–09 Chris Watson 
 2010–11 Chris Adams 
 2012 Robbie Ellis 
 2013 Samuel Holloway
 2014–15 Jeremy Mayall
 2016-17 Chris Gendall 
 2018-19 Dylan Lardelli,
 2020-21 Kenneth Young,

See also
Frances Hodgkins Fellowship
Robert Burns Fellowship

References

External links 
 University of Otago Mozart Fellowship page

Awards and prizes of the University of Otago
Classical music awards
1969 establishments in New Zealand